The Montezuma leopard frog (Lithobates montezumae) is a species of frog in the family Ranidae endemic to Mexico. Its natural habitats are pine-oak or oak forests above  asl but it can also survive in moderately altered habitats. It breeds in lakes and big pools. It is potentially threatened by habitat loss and introduced predators. It is also collected for human consumption.

References

Lithobates
Endemic amphibians of Mexico
Fauna of the Trans-Mexican Volcanic Belt
Taxonomy articles created by Polbot
Amphibians described in 1854
Mexican Plateau